Scrimaliner is a streamliner slingshot dragster.

Designed by Ronnie Scrima, Scrimaliner was built by Scrima and George Bacilek, with the aluminum body hammered by Bob Sorrell, painted metalflake red. There was a small wing between the bicycle wheels, and the cockpit was fully enclosed. The  Chrysler hemi was built by Milodon's Don Alderson.

She first appeared at Lions Dragway in August 1964, driven by Roy "Goober" Tuller.  

Notes

Sources
 Taylor, Thom.  "Beauty Beyond the Twilight Zone" in Hot Rod, April 2017, pp. 30–43.

1960s cars
Drag racing cars
Rear-wheel-drive vehicles